The Pagai spiny rat (Maxomys pagensis) is a species of rodent in the family Muridae.
It is found only in the Mentawai Islands of Indonesia, on South Pagai, North Pagai, Sipora, and Siberut islands.

References
 Baillie, J. 1996.  Maxomys pagensis.   2006 IUCN Red List of Threatened Species.   Downloaded on 19 July 2007.

Rats of Asia
Maxomys
Endemic fauna of Indonesia
Rodents of Indonesia
Fauna of Sumatra
Mentawai Islands Regency
Vulnerable fauna of Asia
Mammals described in 1903
Taxonomy articles created by Polbot